The High Commission of Bangladesh in Islamabad is the chief diplomatic mission of Bangladesh to Pakistan. It is located in Sector F-6 of Islamabad. The present Bangladeshi High Commissioner to Pakistan is Md. Ruhul Alam Siddique, who assumed diplomatic duties in October 2020. Bangladesh also has a Deputy High Commission in Karachi, and an honorary consul in Lahore.

History
Following the Partition of India Bangladesh and Pakistan were a part of a single state for 24 years. In 1970, parliamentary elections were held where the East Bengal-based Awami League led by Bangabandhu Sheikh Mujibur Rahman won a majority of seats in the National Assembly, granting the party an exclusive mandate to form a government. However, the military junta led by dictator Yahya Khan refused to recognise the results of the elections and ordered Operation Searchlight a genocidal crackdown to suppress the Bengali Nationalist Movement. Bangladesh consequently declared independence and following a nine month war, Bangladesh was liberated of occupying forces. Relations between Pakistan and Bangladesh have been strained as a result of Bangladeshi grievances following the Bangladesh Liberation War, the government of Pakistan has refused to apologise for the genocide, mass rape and murder of intellectuals committed against the people of Bangladesh during the war.

Following immense pressure from members of the OIC, Pakistan recognised Bangladesh in February 1974 and diplomatic relations were established. In January 1976, both countries exchanged their envoys for the first time and the Bangladeshi embassy in Islamabad became functional. Initially, the embassy was operated from a "cluttered, four‐room hotel suite" in the neighbouring city of Rawalpindi, where Bangladesh's first envoy Zahiruddin had set up a temporary base, before moving to its permanent location. In 1989, the embassy became a High Commission following Pakistan's rejoining of the Commonwealth after leaving in 1972.

In December 2013, the High Commission received threats of an attack after the Bangladeshi government executed Abdul Quader Molla for his role in the 1971 war, a sentence that was condemned by Pakistan. As a result, security was strengthened around the mission. In October 2014, security measures were renewed at both the High Commission and the Deputy High Commission in Karachi as similar threats were received once again. In January 2016, Pakistan expelled Maushumi Rahman, a political counsellor based at the Bangladeshi High Commission, amidst a diplomatic row as Bangladesh executed more war criminals. The Pakistani move was reportedly pre-empted by Bangladeshi allegations made against Farina Arshad, a diplomat posted at Pakistan's High Commission in Dhaka, whom Bangladesh accused of "spying" and who Pakistan subsequently withdrew on the pretext of "harassment". In May 2019, it was reported that the High Commission's visa operations were being affected as Bangladesh's newly-appointed visa officer was facing paperwork delays from Pakistani authorities.

As of 2021, the Bangladeshi government has purchased five acres of land in the Diplomatic Enclave to inaugurate a new High Commission complex, which is under construction. The new building has been designed by the Bangladeshi architecture firm Shatotto, and is noted to be inspired by the "greenery and wet environment of Bangladesh together with the verticality of the Margalla Hills". The architectural elements and themes used in the design draw upon those used in the ancient Indus and Bengali civilisations, thus presenting a "meeting ground for two civilizations" and reflecting the common past of both countries.

High Commissioners

Md. Ruhul Alam Siddique is the 14th and current Bangladeshi High Commissioner to Pakistan. Siddiqui presented his credentials to the president of Pakistan on 3 November 2020.

Operations
The Bangladeshi High Commission's primary aim is to enhance the political, economic and defence cooperation between Pakistan and Bangladesh. It also provides consular services to Bengalis in Pakistan, and the issuance of Bangladeshi visas. The High Commission's operating hours are from 9 am to 5 pm (PST) on weekdays. The mission is organised into the following sections, each headed by an officer working under the High Commissioner:
 Political Wing
 Mostofa Jamil Khan – First Secretary and Head of Chancery
 Defence Wing 
 Brig. Gen. Abul Fazal Md. Sanaullah – Defence Advisor
 Consular Wing
 Md. Shahidul Islam – Counsellor
 Press Wing

See also

 Bangladesh–Pakistan relations
 High Commissioners of Bangladesh to Pakistan
 Deputy High Commission of Bangladesh, Karachi

References

External links
 

Islamabad
Bangladesh
Bangladesh–Pakistan relations